This national electoral calendar for 2016 lists the national/federal elections held in 2016 in all sovereign states and their dependent territories. By-elections are excluded, though national referendums are included.

January
7 January: Kiribati, Parliament (2nd round)
16 January: Taiwan, President and Parliament
22 January: Vanuatu, Parliament
24 January: Portugal, President

February
14 February: Central African Republic, President  and Parliament 
18 February: Uganda, President and Parliament
21 February: 
Bolivia, Constitutional Referendum
Comoros, President (1st round)
Niger, President (1st round) and Parliament
25 February: Jamaica, House of Representatives
26 February: 
Iran, Parliament (1st round) and Assembly of Experts
Ireland, Assembly
28 February: Switzerland, Referendums

March
3–24 March: New Zealand, Referendum (2nd round)
4 March: Samoa, Parliament
5 March: Slovakia, Parliament
6 March: Benin, President (1st round)
9 March: Kiribati, President
20 March: 
Benin, President (2nd round)
Cape Verde, Parliament
Kazakhstan, Assembly
Laos, Parliament
Niger, President (2nd round)
Republic of Congo, President
Senegal, Constitutional Referendum
31 March: Central African Republic, Parliament (2nd round)

April
6 April: Netherlands, Referendum
8 April: Djibouti, President
10 April: 
Chad, President
Comoros, President (2nd round)
Peru, President (1st round) and Parliament
13 April: 
South Korea, Parliament
Syria, Parliament
17 April: Italy, Referendum
24 April: 
Austria, President (1st round)
Equatorial Guinea, President
Serbia, Parliament
27 April: Guernsey, Legislature
29 April: Iran, Parliament (2nd round)

May
9 May: Philippines, President, Vice President, House of Representatives and Senate
11 May: Comoros, President (2nd round in 13 constituencies) on Anjouan)
14 May: Philippines, President, Vice President, House of Representatives and Senate (in 55 precincts)
15 May: Dominican Republic, President, Chamber of Deputies and Senate
22 May: 
Austria, President (2nd round) (round nullified)
Cyprus, Parliament
Tajikistan, Constitutional Referendum
Vietnam, Parliament

June
5 June: 
Peru, President (2nd round)
Switzerland, Referendums
6 June: Saint Lucia, House of Assembly
7 June: Bahamas, Constitutional Referendum
23 June: 
Bermuda, Referendum
Gibraltar, Brexit Referendum
United Kingdom, Brexit Referendum
25 June: Iceland, President
26 June: Spain, Congress of Deputies
29 June: Mongolia, Parliament

July
2 July: Australia, House of Representatives and Senate
9 July: Nauru, Parliament
10 July: 
Abkhazia, Referendum
Japan, House of Councillors
11 July: Nauru, Parliament (Aiwo only)
17 July: São Tomé and Príncipe, President (1st round)

August
7 August: 
São Tomé and Príncipe, President (2nd round)
Thailand, Constitutional Referendum
11 August: Zambia, President, Parliament and Constitutional Referendum
21 August: Turkmenistan, Council of Elders
27 August: Gabon, President

September
4 September: Hong Kong, Legislature
8–10 September: Seychelles, Parliament
11 September: 
Belarus, House of Representatives
Croatia, Parliament
18 September: 
Liechtenstein, Referendum
Russia, State Duma
20 September: Jordan, House of Representatives
22 September: Isle of Man, House of Keys
25 September: Switzerland, Referendums
26 September:
Azerbaijan, Constitutional Referendum
Sint Maarten, Legislature

October
2 October: 
Cape Verde, President
Colombia, Referendum
Hungary, Referendum
5 October: Curaçao, Legislature
7 October: Morocco, House of Representatives
7–8 October: Czech Republic, Senate (1st round)
8 October: Georgia, Parliament (1st round)
9 October: Lithuania, Parliament (1st round)
14–15 October: Czech Republic, Senate (2nd round)
16 October: Montenegro, Parliament
23 October: Lithuania, Parliament (2nd round)
29 October: Iceland, Parliament
30 October: 
Georgia, Parliament (2nd round)
Ivory Coast, Constitutional Referendum
Moldova, President (1st round)

November
1 November: Palau, President, House of Delegates and Senate
5 November – 17 January 2017: Somalia, 
6 November: 
Bulgaria, President (1st round) and Referendum
Nicaragua, President and Parliament
8 November: United States, President, House of Representatives and Senate
American Samoa, Governor and House of Representatives
Guam, Auditor, Consolidated Commission on Utilities, Education Board, Legislature, and Superior Court retention election
Northern Mariana Islands, House of Representatives, Senate, and Supreme Court retention elections
Puerto Rico, Governor, House of Representatives and Senate
U.S. Virgin Islands, Board of Education, Board of Elections and Legislature
9 November Pitcairn Islands, Mayor
13 November: 
Bulgaria, President (2nd round)
Moldova, President (2nd round)
20 November: 
Haiti, President,   and 
San Marino, Parliament (1st round)
24 November: Grenada, Constitutional Referendum
26 November: Kuwait, Parliament
27 November: Switzerland, Referendum

December
1 December: The Gambia, President
4 December: 
Austria, President (2nd round revote)
Italy, Constitutional Referendum
San Marino, Parliament (2nd round)
Uzbekistan, President
7 December: Ghana, President and Parliament
11 December: 
Hong Kong, Election Committee
Kyrgyzstan, Constitutional Referendum
Republic of Macedonia, Parliament
Romania, Chamber of Deputies and Senate
Transnistria, President
15 December: Turks and Caicos Islands, Legislature
18 December: Ivory Coast, National Assembly

Indirect elections
The following indirect elections of heads of state and the upper houses of bicameral legislatures took place through votes in elected lower houses, unicameral legislatures, or electoral colleges: 
4 January: Marshall Islands, President
27 January: Marshall Islands, President (new election)
26 February: Kosovo, President
11 March: Myanmar, President
14 March and 11 June: India, Council of States
1 April: San Marino, Captains Regent
2 April: Vietnam, President
19 April: Laos, President
25–26 April: Ireland, Senate
10 June and 27 October: Malaysia, Senate
18 June – 18 September: Belarus, Council of the Republic
26 June: Spain, Senate
13 July: Nauru, President
29–30 August, 24 September and 3 October: Estonia, President
1 October: San Marino, Captains Regent
23 April 2014 – 31 October 2016: Lebanon, President (13 rounds in 2016)

See also
2016 in politics

References

National
National
Political timelines of the 2010s by year
National